Ban Mai railway station is a railway station located in Wat Phrik Subdistrict, Phitsanulok City, Phitsanulok. It is located 375.313 km from Bangkok railway station and is a class 3 railway station. It is on the Northern Line of the State Railway of Thailand. The station opened on 24 January 1908 as part of the Northern Line extension from Pak Nam Pho to Phitsanulok.

On the evening of 10 July 2020, ordinary train no. 201 bound for Phitsanulok derailed in the station yard. There were no injuries.

Train services
 Ordinary 201/202 Bangkok-Phitsanulok-Bangkok
 Local 401/402 Lop Buri-Phitsanulok-Lop Buri
 Local 407/408 Nakhon Sawan-Chiang Mai-Nakhon Sawan

References

Ichirō, Kakizaki (2010). Ōkoku no tetsuro: tai tetsudō no rekishi. Kyōto: Kyōtodaigakugakujutsushuppankai. 
 Otohiro, Watanabe (2013). Tai kokutetsu yonsenkiro no tabi: shasō fūkei kanzen kiroku. Tōkyō: Bungeisha. 

Railway stations in Thailand